is the first album of the J-pop singer Aya Matsuura, a Hello! Project solo artist, containing her first four singles. It was released on January 1, 2002 and sold 293,540 copies.

Track listing 
All lyrics are written by Tsunku.
  – 4:28
  – 4:36
  – 4:51
  – 4:36
  – 3:36
  – 4:48
  – 4:17
  – 4:07
  – 4:14
  – 5:11
  – 3:59

External links 
 First Kiss entry on the Up-Front Works official website

2001 debut albums
Aya Matsuura albums
Zetima albums